Aishling Sheridan (born 18 July 1996) is an Irish sportswoman who plays Australian rules football for the Collingwood Football Club in the AFL Women's (AFLW). She has also played  ladies' Gaelic football for Cavan in the Gaelic Athletic Association (GAA) and Australian rules football for NT Thunder in the VFL Women's (VFLW).

Ladies' Gaelic football
Sheridan played for Cavan in the Gaelic Athletic Association (GAA). She received Team of the League Division 2 honours in 2017 and 2018. With Sheridan, Cavan reached the 2018 Division 2 League Final, but were beaten by Tipperary, despite Sheridan scoring two goals. However after losing to Monaghan in the Relegation Qualifiers, they beat Tipperary in the 2018 Relegation play-offs and stayed at the senior level for the 2019 season while Tipperary were relegated to the intermediate level. In April 2019, Sheridan scored a hat-trick for Cavan against Kerry. In August 2019, Sheridan helped Cavan once again in the Relegation play-offs, beating Westmeath to stay at senior level for the 2020 season.

State-tier Australian rules football
In September 2018, Sheridan took part in a week-long CrossCoders camp in Melbourne together with 10 other Irish players, including Sarah Rowe who she attended Dublin City University with and would later become her teammate at Collingwood. The camp included kicking sessions, combine tests, a game of CrossCoders against a 2nd-tier VFL Women's (VFLW) side, and a 2km test. In May 2019, she flew back to Australia to play for NT Thunder in the VFLW for a month, alongside fellow Irishwoman Ailish Considine. The first weekend with NT Thunder she couldn't play due to registration issues and another weekend was a bye round for the club, so she ended up playing only two games, the first at TIO Stadium, NT Thunder's home ground, against Southern Saints and the second against Collingwood, the club which would later sign her professionally. During the bye round she played in a challenge match against the U18 side. During her time with NT Thunder, she played in the back and midfield positions, which aren't her regular positions, and therefore as she said "was out of my comfort zone which was good because it's the best way probably to learn". Her prominence at the CrossCoders camp and impressive performance in the VFLW made her highly sought by at least three clubs.

AFL Women's career
Sheridan signed with Collingwood as a Category B rookie, joining fellow cross-code rookies Sarah Rowe and Sharni Layton, during the 2019 rookie signing period in June.<ref name="The42Jun19">{{cite news|url=https://www.the42.ie/aishling-sheridan-feature-collingwood-signing-ailish-considine-sarah-rowe-4682692-Jun2019/|title='If someone told me this time last year, 'You'll sign a contract to be a professional athlete,' I'd have said, 'Never|newspaper=The42|first=Emma|last=Duffy|date=14 June 2019}}</ref> Playing in a practice training match against North Melbourne in January 2020, she caught the eye, offering great speed in the forward line. Sheridan made her professional debut against West Coast at Victoria Park in the opening round of the 2020 season, with Rowe presenting her guernsey before the match. The following round, Sheridan scored her first goal against Collingwood's old rivals Carlton in their first-ever win over them in the AFLW. She scored her second goal a week later in a close loss against Fremantle. Sheridan's first season with Collingwood was a huge success, helping the club reach the finals series. In  her debut season, she won the Best First Year Player award, together with Alana Porter.

Personal life
Sheridan's close family are all involved in Gaelic football. Her father Gerry played for both Mullahoran and Cavan, as well as managing the Cavan Ladies. Her mother Monica and sisters Geraldine, Louise, and Mona all played for Mullahoran. Sheridan attended Dublin City University and graduated in November 2018 with a degree in Athletic Therapy and Training.

StatisticsStatistics are correct the end of the S7 (2022) season.''

|- 
! scope="row" style="text-align:center" | 2020
|style="text-align:center;"|
| 14 || 7 || 2 || 4 || 26 || 43 || 69 || 9 || 15 || 0.3 || 0.6 || 3.7 || 6.1 || 9.9 || 1.3 || 2.1
|- 
! scope="row" style="text-align:center" | 2021
|style="text-align:center;"|
| 14 || 11 || 8 || bgcolor=FFBBFF | 12‡ || 59 || 42 || 101 || 22 || 26 || 0.7 || bgcolor=FA8072 | 1.1§ || 5.4 || 3.8 || 9.2 || 2.0 || 2.4
|- 
! scope="row" style="text-align:center" | 2022
|style="text-align:center;"|
| 14 || 10 || 4 || 1 || 48 || 59 || 107 || 16 || 27 || 0.4 || 0.1 || 4.8 || 5.9 || 10.7 || 1.6 || 2.7
|- 
! scope="row" style="text-align:center" | S7 (2022)
|style="text-align:center;"|
| 14 || 9 || 0 || 1 || 56 || 33 || 89 || 10 || 41 || 0.0 || 0.1 || 6.2 || 3.7 || 9.9 || 1.1 || 4.6
|- class="sortbottom"
! colspan=3| Career
! 37
! 14
! 18
! 189
! 177
! 366
! 57
! 109
! 0.4
! 0.5
! 5.1
! 4.8
! 9.9
! 1.5
! 2.9
|}

References

External links 

1996 births
Living people
Collingwood Football Club (AFLW) players
Irish female players of Australian rules football
Ladies' Gaelic footballers who switched code
Irish expatriate sportspeople in Australia